The 1986 WFA Cup Final was the 16th final of the WFA Cup, England's primary cup competition for women's football teams. The showpiece event was played under the auspices of the Women's Football Association (WFA).

Match

Summary
Norwich City and Doncaster Belles contested the match at Carrow Road in Norwich on 4 May 1986. Norwich City won the match 4-3.

References

External links
 
 Report at WomensFACup.co.uk

Cup
Women's FA Cup finals
Doncaster Rovers Belles L.F.C. matches
May 1986 sports events in the United Kingdom